David John Davies (20 February 1941 – ) was a Welsh rugby union, and professional rugby league footballer who played in the 1960s. He played  representative level rugby union (RU) for Wales, and at club level for Neath RFC, as a flanker, i.e. number 6 or 7, and club level rugby league (RL) for Leeds and Dewsbury.

Background
John Davies was born in Neath, Wales, and a physical education teacher at Foxwood School, Seacroft, Leeds from 1963 until 1969, he suffered a suspected heart attack shortly after being stretchered from the field in the Heavy Woollen District local derby; Dewsbury's 8-7 victory over Batley at Crown Flatt, Dewsbury on Tuesday 15 April 1969, and he died aged 28 on the way to hospital in Dewsbury, West Riding of Yorkshire, England.

Playing career

International honours
John Davies won a cap for Wales (RU) while at Neath RFC in 1962 against Ireland.

References

External links
Search for "Davies" at rugbyleagueproject.org
Search for "David John Davies" at britishnewspaperarchive.co.uk
Search for "David Davies" at britishnewspaperarchive.co.uk
Search for "John Davies" at britishnewspaperarchive.co.uk

1941 births
1969 deaths
Dewsbury Rams players
Footballers who switched code
Leeds Rhinos players
Neath RFC players
Rugby league players from Neath
Rugby union flankers
Rugby union players from Neath
Wales international rugby union players
Welsh rugby league players
Welsh rugby union players
Welsh schoolteachers